The Collected Books of Jack Spicer first appeared in 1975, ten years after the death of Jack Spicer. It was "edited & with a commentary by Robin Blaser" and published in Santa Rosa, California by Black Sparrow Press. A primary document of the San Francisco Renaissance, The Collected Books of Jack Spicer has arguably reached the status of a twentieth century "classic" and helped to define an emerging countertradition to the prevailing literary establishment. Since this edition has gone out of print, it has been updated, revised and republished as  My Vocabulary Did This To Me. The Collected Poetry of Jack Spicer, Edited by Peter Gizzi and Kevin Killian (Wesleyan University Press, 2008).

Contents of The Collected Books of Jack Spicer

The content's page of The Collected Books of Jack Spicer (Fifth Printing, 1996) is divided into four sections:

First (1) section
Reprints twelve books of poetry composed between 1957-1965 and in (for the most part) chronological order.

 (Only the title is listed on the content's page. However, each title page itself lists a date and, in some cases, a subtitle. These are shown below)

After Lorca, With an Introduction by Federico García Lorca, 1957
Admonitions, 1958
A Book of Music, with words by Jack Spicer, 1958
Billy the Kid, 1958
Fifteen False Propositions Against God, 1958
A Red Wheelbarrow, [1968]
Apollo Sends Seven Nursery Rhymes to James Alexander,
Lament for The Makers, 1961
Heads of the Town up to the Aether,  ("Homage to Creeley"; "A Fake Novel About The
Life of Arthur Rimbaud"; "A Textbook of Poetry"), 1960–61
The Holy Grail,  ("The Book of Gawain", "The Book of Percival", "The Book of 
Lancelot", "The Book of Gwenivere", "The Book of Merlin", "The Book of Galahad",
"The Book of the Death of Arthur"), 1962
Language,  ("Thing Language", "Love Poems", "Intermissions", "Transformations", 
"Morphemics", "Phonemics", "Graphemics"), 1964
Book of Magazine Verse,  (Poems: "for The Nation", "for Poetry Chicago", 
"for Tish", "for Ramparts", "for The St. Louis Sporting News",
"for the Vancouver Festival", "for Downbeat"), (no date follows)

Second (2) section
"The Practice of Outside", an essay by Robin Blaser.

Third (3) section
"Poems & Documents" which lists the following:
Imaginary Elegies I-VI
The Unvert Manifesto
Song for Bird and Myself
Poem to the Reader of the Poem
"Poetry as Magic" Workshop Questionnaire
The Trojan Wars Reviewed: A Capitulation
Troy Poem

Fourth (4) section
"Bibliography of First Editions"

Further reading

A Book Of Correspondences For Jack Spicer. Edited By David Levi Strauss and Benjamin Hollander. San Francisco: A Journal of Acts (#6) (1987) (this is a collection of essays, poetry and documents celebrating Spicer).
The Collected Books of Jack Spicer. Edited and with commentary by Robin Blaser. Santa Rosa, Calif.: Black Sparrow Press, 1975.
The House that Jack Built: The Collected Lectures of Jack Spicer, ed. Peter Gizzi - Hanover, NH: Wesleyan University Press.
My vocabulary did this to me. The Collected Poetry of Jack Spicer, Edited by Peter Gizzi and Kevin Killian, Wesleyan University Press, 2008.
Ellingham, Lew, and Kevin Killian. Poet Be Like God: Jack Spicer and the San Francisco Renaissance. Middletown, Conn.: Wesleyan University Press, 1998.
Foster, Edward Halsey. Jack Spicer, Boise, Idaho : Boise State University, c1991
Tallman, Warren. In the Midst. Vancouver: Talonbooks, 1992.

1975 books
American poetry collections